The Paléo Festival de Nyon, usually just called Paléo, is an annual rock festival held in Nyon, Switzerland. It started in a small way in 1976 as the Nyon Folk Festival. The first one was held in the village hall in Nyon. From 1977 until 1989, it was held at Colovray, Nyon, by Lake Geneva and had only two stages, but today it is one of the major open-air music festivals in mainland Europe and the biggest in Switzerland. Today the event has grown to include international artists. In 1990, it moved to its current location, at the Plaine de l'Asse, accessible either by walking, bus or the Chemin de fer Nyon-St-Cergue-Morez narrow-gauge railway.

The festival lasts six days at the end of July, from Tuesday to Sunday, and the final main stage concert is preceded by a great firework display with music.

As of 2005, 3.5 million spectators and 2500 artists had been part of the Paléo Festival.

Stages

The Paléo features six stages:
 La Grande Scène (the Main Stage)
 Vega (Which replaced Les Arches in 2022)
 Le Club Tent (the Club Tent)
 La Ruche (the hive) (formerly called 'La Crique')
 Le Dôme (the Dome)
 Belleville (since 2022, dedicated to electronic music)
 Le Détour (regional bands now located inside the festival, formerly called 'FMR' which was a free stage)

Since 2003, the Paléo has introduced Le Village du Monde (The World Village) section, which is a space reserved for an invited region of the world. This place offers the region's culture and food. It also includes Le Dôme which shows only artists from the invited region.

280,000 visitors and over 5,000 staff participated in the 2015 event.

Tickets
Tickets can be purchased on the Paléo Website.
Special offers are available usually as early as November of the year preceding the next Paléo festival with discounted all-week passes. Later in Spring the official programme is published and the second, slightly less discounted tickets are available. They are often sold out very quickly. In the months preceding the festival more tickets are sold at full price.

To fight black-market ticket sales, 1500 one-day tickets are held up to be sold the same day as their validity date and can be purchased online (to be printed by the buyer).

The lineup used to be revealed on a late April Wednesday at noon, following which, both tickets and passes would sell out within days. From 2008 onwards, the lineup is unveiled one week prior to the sale, giving people plenty of time to make up their mind and thus rushing them online to get their tickets one week later. In 2009, all 280,000 tickets and passes were sold in a record one-and-a-half hours.

Yearly summary

1997
Invited artists:
Al Jarreau
Eddy Mitchell
IAM
Isaac Hayes
Jamiroquai
Jane Birkin
Johnny Clegg & Savuka
Khaled
Morcheeba
Noa
Noir Désir
Pascal Obispo
Placebo
Shaggy
Simple Minds
Sinéad O'Connor
Suzanne Vega
Texas

For a full list see the 1997 history.

1998
Invited artists:
Charles Trenet
Claude Nougaro
Dolly
Eagle-Eye Cherry
Faudel
Herbie Hancock
IAM
Jean-Louis Aubert
Joe Cocker
K's Choice
Linton Kwesi Johnson
Louise Attaque
-M-
MC Solaar
Patricia Kaas
Portishead
The Prodigy
The Wailers
Run-D.M.C.
Stereophonics
Yann Tiersen

For a full list see the 1998 history.

1999
Invited artists:
Alliance Ethnik
Ben Harper
Celia Cruz
Charles Aznavour
Cheb Mami
Fun Lovin' Criminals
Garbage
Gotthard
Iggy Pop
Stephan Eicher

For a full list see the 1999 history.

2000
Invited artists:
Beck
Bloodhound Gang
Buena Vista Social Club
Compay Segundo
Rita Mitsouko
Louise Attaque
Massilia Sound System
Mickey 3D
Morcheeba
Muse
Noir Désir
Oasis
Patrick Bruel
Pink Martini
Renaud
Saian Supa Crew

For a full list see the 2000 history.

2001
Invited artists:
Ben Harper
Kool & the Gang
Lynda Lemay
Manu Chao
Natalia M. King
Placebo
Red Snapper
St. Germain
Texas
The Young Gods
Tom McRae
Vanessa Paradis

For a full list see the 2001 history.

2002
Invited artists:
Zucchero
Yann Tiersen
The Cure
Supertramp
Pet Shop Boys
MC Solaar
Jovanotti
Noir Désir
Indochine
James Brown

For a full list see the 2002 history.

2003
Invited artists:
Asian Dub Foundation
R.E.M.
Alanis Morissette
Ibrahim Ferrer
Jimmy Cliff
Massive Attack
Nada Surf
Renaud
Ska-P
The Cardigans

For a full list see the 2003 history.

This year saw the first Village du Monde. Africa was invited with Cameroon, Nigeria and other countries from that continent.

2004
Invited artists:
Eros Ramazzotti
Jamel Debbouze (a French comedian in the festival's only non-musical show scheduled on the main scene)
Pascal Obispo
Peter Gabriel
Stephan Eicher
Starsailor
Texas
Muse
Myslovitz (From Poland)

Latin America was invited at the Village du Monde. Specifically Venezuela, Colombia, Equator, Peru and Mexico among others.

For a full list see the 2004 history.

2005
In 2005, the following world-renowned artists participated at the Paléo (among many others):
Lenny Kravitz
George Clinton (funk musician)
Jamiroquai
Starsailor
Rammstein
Samael
IAM
Stress
Pink Martini
Babylon Circus
Franz Ferdinand

That year was considered very successful, with a cool but clear weather for most of the week (except some short showers on Sunday).
Asia was the region invited to the Village du Monde, including China, Tibet, Nepal, Vietnam, Thailand and Japan.

For a full list see the 2005 history.

2006
Paléo took place from 18 to 23 July 2006 with the following artists:
Depeche Mode
Placebo
The Who
Tracy Chapman
Ben Harper and the Innocent Criminals
Pixies
Goldfrapp
Ziggy Marley
HIM
The Dandy Warhols
Dub Incorporation
Benabar
Feeder
The Kooks
Indochine
Hateful Monday

Eastern Europe hosted the Village du Monde.

For a full list see the 2006 history.

2007
Björk
Muse
Arctic Monkeys
Jean-Louis Murat
Rachid Taha
Arcade Fire
Arno
Malouma
Pink
Robert Plant
Laurent Voulzy
Grand Corps Malade
Joey Starr
Stress
Oxmo Puccino
Daby Toure
Zucchero
Lynda Lemay
Ayo
Groundation
Bitty Mc Lean feat. Sly & Robbie
Tryo
Sanseverino
Emily Loizeau
Gad Elmaleh
Air
The Young Gods
Cassius
Renaud
Zazie
Gogol Bordello
The Locos
La Ruda
Tinariwen
Michel Corboz
Natacha Atlas
Idir

For a full list see the 2007 history.

2008
The Hives
The Raveonettes
Massive Attack
Mika
Yael Naïm
R.E.M.
Justice

R.E.M. headlined the Sunday night.

For a full list see the 2008 history.

2009
2009 edition of Paléo took place from the 21 to 26 July 2009. Below list includes some of the musicians who performed during the concert:

Sunny Lakherwal
Rohit Rattan
Gautam Bagri
Rodrigo Y Gabriela
Moby
Amy Macdonald
Placebo
The Ting Tings
Kaiser Chiefs
Tracy Chapman
Rishipal Singh Padha
Ayo
Gossip
The Prodigy
Fatboy Slim
Pete Doherty
TV On The Radio
Franz Ferdinand
Sophie Hunger
White Lies
Izia
Daily Bread
The Bianca Story
Peter Kernel
Girls in the Kitchen
The V.AC.
The Young Gods play "Woodstock"
Ghinzu
Pascale Picard Band
Peter von Poehl
The Black Box Revelation
Yodelice
Bonaparte
Mama Rosin
Thomas More Project
Commodor
2manydjs
Hugh Coltman
Karkwa
Naive New Beaters
Heidi Happy
Tim & Puma Mimi
Brutus
Charlie Winston
Naive New Beaters
Toboggan
Gautam Bagri
Josef Of The Fountain
Santigold (ex Santogold)
Cold War Kids
Caravan Palace
Grace
Evelinn Trouble & Trespassers
DatA
Kate Wax
Nancy Glowbus
The Proteins
Trilok Gurtu
Anaïs
Julien Doré
La Chanson du Dimanche
Dhoad Gypsies from Rajahsthan
Masaladosa
Kiran Ahluwalia
Dhabi
Olli & the Bollywood Orchestra
Alborosie
Omar Perry & Homegrown Band
Takana Zion
La Pulqueria
Rohit Rattan	
Achanak
Ska-P
Zone Libre vs Casey & B. James
La Pulqueria
Tumi and the Volume
Ska Nerfs
Francis Cabrel
Les Ogres de Barback
La Grande Sophie
Debout Sur Le Zinc
Zedrus
Raghunath Manet
Karsh Kale & MIDIval Punditz
Musafir - Gypsies of Rajasthan
Jaipur Maharaja Brass Band
Abd al Malik
Oxmo Puccino
La Gale et Rynox
Trip In
Tweek

India was the region invited to the Village du Monde.

For a full list see the 2009 history.

2010
In 2010, the festival was held from July 20 to July the 24th. Some of the performing artists included:

N*E*R*D
Iggy and The Stooges
Motörhead
Damien Saez
Suprême NTM
Two Door Cinema Club
Charlie Winston
Foals
Crosby, Stills & Nash
Johnny Clegg
Milow
Archive
Gentleman & The Evolution
Sens Unik
Jamiroquai
Plastiscines
John Butler Trio
Paolo Nutini
Klaxons
Indochine

The Motto for the Village du Monde was Southern Africa.

For a full list see the 2010 history.

2011
The 2011 edition of the Paléo Festival took place from Tuesday, July the 19th to Sunday, July the 24th. The following list includes some of the acts that were confirmed on the 5th of April:

AaRON
Admiral James T.
Jean-Louis Aubert
Beirut
Bloody Beetroots
James Blunt
The Chemical Brothers
Cocoon
Les Cowboys Fringants
The Dø
PJ Harvey
Jack Johnson
Mika (replaced Amy Winehouse)
Metronomy
Moriarty
Yael Naïm
The National
Noisettes
Patrice & The Supowers
Robert Plant & The Band of Joy
Portishead
Pulled Apart By Horses
The Strokes
Stromae
Tarun Bhardwaj Ambala Waale
Amy Winehouse (canceled her European Tour due to alcohol problems)
William White
Zaz and her band

The Motto for the Village du Monde was the Caribbean.

For a full list see the 2011 history.

2012

17 July
 Manu Chao
 Franz Ferdinand
 Hubert-Félix Thiéfaine
 Camille
 Brigitte
 M83
 Quentin Mottier
 Baba Zula

18 July
 The Cure
 Justice
 Mashrou' Leila
 Natacha Atlas
 Dionysos
 Bon Iver
 Dominique A
 Other Lives
 Warpaint

19 July
 Sting
 Stephan Eicher
 Caravan Palace
 Chinese Man
 Groundation
 Raggasonic
 Le Nico Baillod Band
 Le Trio Joubran

20 July
 Lenny Kravitz
 Rodrigo y Gabriela
 Imany
 Irma
 Orelsan
 1995
 C2C

21 July
 Garbage
 Bloc Party
 The Kooks
 The Kills
 Bénabar
 Thomas Dutronc
 GiedRé
 Agoria
 Avishai Cohen

22 July
 David Guetta
 Roger Hodgson
 Kev Adams
 77 Bombay Street
 Maxime Vengerov

2013
23 July
 Neil Young and Crazy Horse
 Two Gallants
 Phoenix
 Sophie Hunger
 Alt-J
 Lou Doillon
24 July
 Arctic Monkeys
 The Smashing Pumpkins
 Asaf Avidan
 Beach House
 Dranko Jones
 The Bloody Beetroots
25 July
 Dub Incorporation
 Santana
 Tryo
 Stupeflip
 Sigur Rós
 Kadebostany
26 July
 Nick Cave and the Bad Seeds
 -M-
 Youssoupha
 Keny Arkana
27 July
 Blur
 BB Brunes
 Damien Saez
 Benjamin Biolay
 Kavinsky
 Oxmo Puccino
28 July
 Patrick Bruel
 Bastian Baker
 Michaël Grégorio
 Raphael
 Paul Meyer with Le Concert Européen

2014
 Vincent Veillon et Vincent Kucholl
 Seasick Steve
 Thirty Seconds to Mars

2015
 Robbie Williams
 Gary Clark Jr.

2016
 Muse
 Bastille

2017
 Red Hot Chili Peppers
 Arcade Fire
 Macklemore and Ryan Lewis
 Foals 
 Pixies
 Black M
 Christophe Maé
 Petit Biscuit
 Midnight Oil
 Lola Marsh

2018
 Gorillaz
 The Killers
 Lenny Kravitz
 Kaleo
 Depeche Mode
 Indochine
 MGMT
 Jain
 Jamel Debbouze
 Romeo Elvis 
 Suprême NTM
 Nekfeu
 Bigflo & Oli
 Angèle
 Feder
 Lorenzo
 Orelsan
 Emir Kusturica & The No Smoking Orchestra

2019

2020
The 2020 edition was cancelled due to the COVID-19 pandemic.

2021
The 2021 edition was cancelled due to the COVID-19 pandemic.

2022

See also

List of historic rock festivals
List of jam band music festivals

References

External links

Paleo Festival
A complete history of the Paléo

Nyon
Tourist attractions in the canton of Vaud
1976 establishments in Switzerland
Music festivals established in 1976
Rock festivals in Switzerland
Summer events in Switzerland